Telugu cuisine is a cuisine of South India native to the Telugu people from the states of Andhra, Telangana, and Yanam. Generally known for its tangy, hot, and spicy taste, the cuisine is as diverse as the people and regions in which it is consumed.

Regional variations

The regions of Coastal Andhra, Rayalaseema, and Telangana all produce distinctive variations of Telugu cuisine. In the semi-arid Telangana region, millet-based bread known as rotte is the predominant staple food, whereas rice is the staple in the irrigated regions of Andhra and Rayalaseema. Ragi is also popular in Rayalaseema. The curries, snacks, and sweets produced in these areas vary in both name and method of preparation from region to region.

Andhra Pradesh is the leading producer of red chili and rice in India, and Telangana is the leading producer of millet. The concentration of red chili production in Andhra Pradesh has led to the liberal use of spices in Telugu cuisine. Vegetarian dishes, as well as meat, and seafood in coastal areas, feature prominently. Tomato pappu, gongura, and tamarind are widely used for cooking curries. Spicy and hot varieties of pickle are also an important part of Telugu cuisine, including avakaya. "Deltaic" cuisine from Guntur in Coastal Andhra is known as the spiciest variety of Telugu cuisine, primarily because of the use of red chilis traditionally grown in the region.

The eating habits of Hindu royals and Brahmin, as well as Muslim Nawabi royal families have historically had a heavy influence on Telugu cuisine. Andhra Pradesh and Telangana's proximity to Western, Central, and Eastern India influenced the diversity of those border regions' cuisine as well, as the Telugu-speaking population spread into neighboring states. Different communities have developed their own variations, and rural areas still follow centuries-old cooking methods and recipes.

Coastal Andhra 

Coastal Andhra is dominated by the Krishna and Godavari river delta regions and is adjacent to the Bay of Bengal. This proximity to water has led to rice, lentils, and seafood becoming dietary staples in the region. Andhra cuisine has its own variations, but dishes are predominantly rice-based. The Nellore region in the south has its own unique recipes, markedly different from those in Uttarandhra. Ulava charu is a soup made from horse gram, and bommidala pulusu is a seafood stew that is considered a specialty of Andhra Pradesh. Andhra cuisine is prevalent in restaurants all over Andhra Pradesh, as well as in cities like Bangalore, Chennai, and New Delhi.

Uttarandhra

The Uttarandhra region is composed of the northeastern districts of Srikakulam, Vizianagaram, and Visakhapatnam in Coastal Andhra. While Visakhapatnam district has a cuisine closer in character to the rest of Andhra's districts, Vizianagaram and Srikakulam cuisine shares less in common with other Andhra regional cuisines. The food of the Uttarandhra region is often sweeter than in other regions of Andhra Pradesh. Lentils are often cooked in jaggery, a dish referred to as bellam pappu, and are usually served with butter and steamed rice.

Vegetables are often cooked in a gravy of menthi kura (fenugreek seed paste), avapettina kura (mustard seed paste), or nuvvugunda kura (sesame paste). Ullikaram is another popular dish in which vegetables or corn seeds are flavored with shallots or onion paste.

Poori and patoli are popular breakfast or festival dishes. Patoli is composed of soaked split black chickpeas (senagapappu or chana dal) ground to a coarse paste and seasoned with coriander seeds, onions, and sometimes cluster beans (goruchikkudu kaya). Upma or uppudu pindi is coarsely broken rice steamed with vegetables and seeds. This dish is eaten on feast days, when people fast during the day and eat at night. Attu, also called dosa, is a standard breakfast in Andhra Pradesh, which may also include coconut or tomato chutneys. Idli is also very common. Karappoddi is a popular curry powder that is served with idli, dosa and upma.
 
Inguva charu is a sweet-and-sour stew made with tamarind and hing. It can be eaten with rice or uppupindi. Bellam pulusu is another flavorful, thick, sweet stew made out of rice flour, jaggery, corn cobs, and whole shallots.

The pickles used in Uttarandhra differ from those of other regions of Andhra Pradesh. Avakaya is a mango pickle which is part of a standard Andhra meal. Pieces of mango are coated with mustard powder, red pepper powder, and salt, then sun-dried, and finally soaked in sesame oil to give the pickle extended shelf life. The result of this process is a darker hue and a sweeter taste than other pickles. This method helps preserve Uttarandhra pickles better amidst the high moisture from the Bay of Bengal coast.

Rayalaseema 

Rayalaseema, in the south of Andhra Pradesh, is well-known for the spiciness of its cuisine due to liberal use of chili powder in almost every dish. Seema karam is a dish unique to this region. Some of the main courses include rice, jonna, (jowar), ragi roti with neyyi, and raagi sangati, usually served with spinach or pulusu. Uggani is a dish unique to Rayalaseema, especially Ananthapur, Kurnool, and Kadapa districts, as well as in Karnataka, where it is called oggane. It is made with boiled paddycorn and is generally yellowish in color due to heavy use of turmeric powder. It is usually served with mirapakaya bajji (chili "bajji"). Uggani bajji is served primarily as a breakfast dish, but can be eaten as a snack too. It is spicy and a signature dish of Rayalaseema and Eastern Karnataka.

Sweeter dishes of Rayalaseema include attirasaalu or attirasa (rice-based vada with jaggery), pakam undalu (a mixture of steamed rice flour, ground nuts, and jaggery), borugu undalu (a sweet made of jowar and jaggery), and rava ladd. Masala borugulu, nargis mandakki, and ponganaalu (wet rice flour fried in oil, with carrot, onion, and chilis) are other savory specialties from the region.

Telangana

Telangana state is located on the Deccan Plateau, and its environment lends itself to a cuisine based on millet and roti. Jowar and pearl millet, or bajra, are also prominent features in Telangana cuisine. Due to the state's proximity to Maharashtra, Chhattisgarh, and northwest Karnataka, it shares some similarities with other Deccan Plateau cuisines.

Recent years have seen a resurgence of Telangana cuisine in Hyderabad, with many restaurants now serving thali  for lunch.

Staple Telangana foods
Telanganan cuisine frequently makes use of roti made from millet, such as jonna rotte (sorghum) and sajja rotte (pennisetum), or sarva pindi and uppudi pindi (broken rice). In Telangana a gravy or curry is called koora or pulusu (a sour version) and uses a tamarind base. A deep-fried reduction of the same is called vepudu. Kodi pulusu and mamsam vepudu are popular meat dishes. Vankaya (brinjal) koora, baingan bhartha, aloogadda (potato) koora, bendakaya (okra) pulusu are common vegetable dishes. Palakoora pappu is a spinach dish cooked with lentils and eaten with steamed rice and roti. Peanuts are added in some special cases, and in Karimnagar District, cashew nuts are sometimes used.

Popular Telangana koora dishes include boti, derived from mutton, and thunti koora made from red sorrel leaves. Potlakaya pulusu, or snake gourd stew is another daily staple for many Telanganans. Sakinalu and garelu are popular fries/fritters made of rice flour which are eaten during festivals like Dussehra and Sankranti. Sugar madugulu is a sweet made with milk and butter with sugar coating, and pharda pheni is a sugar-coated crispy wafer.

Vegetarian cuisine of Telangana

Tamarind, red chilis (koraivikaram) and asafetida are prominently used in Telangana vegetarian cuisine. Roselle is a major staple used extensively in curries and pickles.

Sarva pindi, a spicy pancake, is a common breakfast, made from rice flour, chana dal, ginger, garlic, sesame seeds, curry leaves, and green chilis.
Puntikura chana dal: A vegetarian alternative to 'gongura ghosht', consisting of chana dal cooked in spices and tempered with mustard and curry leaves.
Bachali kura: A tangy spinach curry cooked with tamarind paste.
Pachi pulusu: A spicy, raw rasam made with tamarind, chili, and onions. Prepared mainly in summer.
Rail palaram: a traditional food made from rice flour. Steamed rice flour balls are stir-fried with soaked chana dal, curry leaves, green chilis, onion, and grated fresh coconut.

Non-vegetarian Telangana cuisine
Ooru kodi pulusu, a chicken curry
Golichina Mamsam, a spicy fried mutton dish
Ankapur chicken, a spicy chicken curry
Boti curry, curried lamb gizzards
Kaalla kura (paya), goat leg curry
 Mutton curry

Other Telangana dishes 
Jonna gatka 
Makka gatka
Ambali, a vegetarian summer drink/porridge common in Karnataka.
Makka rotti 
Kudumulu
Passham, a sweet with two varieties: one with jaggery and milk, and the other with talukalu prepared from dough.
Odapa
Pyalalu
Sabhudhana upma 
Antuvuls, also called bajji (pulusu with vegetables)
Kadambam
Makka gudaalu
Bebarla gudaalu
Sala pachi pulusu
Challa charu, a dish prepared by tempering buttermilk
Atukulu
Makkajona garelu
Ponganallu
Sajja kudumulu with onion chutney
Sadhulu, varieties of rice, mainly cooked for the Sadhula Bathukama festival. Typically prepared in the following flavors: sesame (nuvulu), groundnuts (palilu), Bengal gram (putnalu), coconut  (kobari), tamarind (chintapandu pulusu), lemon (nimakaya), mango (mamidikaya), yogurt (perugu)
Guddalu, prepared with different beans, corn, chana, and sprouts, along with spices and onions.
Garje, a sweet filled with lentils and either sugar or jaggery.
Rotu tokkulu, prepared by semi-frying vegetables, grinding them, and then adding thadka.
Kallegura ( kallegalapula kura), a mixed vegetable curry, generally prepared during the Sankranti festival

Breakfast

A typical Andhra breakfast consists of a few of the items listed below. Usually it consists of idli, garelu a.k.a. vada (deep-fried lentil dough), minapattu, also known as dosa, (a rice- and lentil-based pancake or crepe). Tea, coffee with milk, or simply milk often accompany these dishes. The most common dishes consumed for breakfast are:

'Idli', Urad dal and rice steamed dumplings, often eaten with freshly-made chutney or with neyyi added and sprinkled with karrap podi (chili dal powder) or chutney and sambar.

Andhra dosa, a rice- and urad dal-based crepe eaten with chutney and sambar.
Minapattu, a rice- and lentil-based crepe, served with chutney and sambar
Pesarattu, a green gram-based crepe. It is usually served with ginger chutney. Sometimes pesarattu is filled with upma,  in which case it is known as upma pesarattu.
Dibba attu, a deep-fried dosa made with idli batter
Atukula dosa, a dosa made from atukulu, a.k.a. poha.
Rava (Suji) dosa, a dosa made with sooji dough with chili, coriander leaves, onion, and pepper.

 Andhra upma
 Godhuma uppindi, upma made from broken wheat flour
 Pesarpindi uppindi, a dry porridge made of green gram flour. Commonly served with yoghurt or mango-jaggery pickle.
 Pulusu uppindi, a dry porridge made with rice flour, peanuts, and tamarind extract. Commonly served with yoghurt or mango-jaggery pickle.
 Beeyam rava pesasara pappu, literally translated as "made with broken rice and hulled green gram". Commonly served with yoghurt or mango-jaggery pickle.
 Varipindi uppindi, a dry porridge made with rice flour and hulled green gram. Commonly served with yoghurt or mango-jaggery pickle.
Uppudu pindi or uppindi a.k.a. upma, a porridge made from broken sooji flour, ghee, and vegetables. Commonly served with buttermilk or a spicy-savoury powder made from pulses.
Saggubiyyam (sago) upma, an upma made from sago (saboodana).
Semiya upma, an upma made with vermicelli.

Vada
Garelu, a deep-fried lentil-based doughnut, or sometimes a deep-fried dal mixture.
Punukulu or Punugulu, a.k.a. Bonda, a deep-fried dish made from idli/dosa batter.
Gunta punugulu, made from rice and dal batter
Saggubiyyam punugulu, vada made from sago (saboodana).
Mung dal punugulu, or bonda, a deep-fried dish made from idli/dosa batter.
Thapala chekkalu, a deep-fried rice and dal-based flat vada with onions, curry leaves, and chili.

 Atukulu/poha
 Atukulu, also known as poha in the northern states; moist rice flakes sautéed in oil.
Atukula dosa, dosa made from atukulu a.k.a. poha.
Atukula upma, upma made from atukulu, replacing atukulu with sooji.

 Bread and roti
Nokulu annam, made of jowar and jaggery.
Chapati, baked flattened wheat dough, served with dal or chutney.
Puri, wheat dough deep-fried in cooking oil. Served with potato bajji or chutney. Technically a north Indian dish, but widely available in all Telugu restaurants.

Lunch and dinner 

Great effort is put into preparing lunch and dinner in many Telugu households. In most urban households, the food is served on stainless steel or porcelain plates, while in traditional and rural households, the food may be served on a banana leaf. The banana leaf is often used during festivals, special occasions, and for guests. Many middle-budget restaurants in smaller towns also use banana leaves for serving food. At times, a vistaraaku (a larger plate made of several leaves sewn together) is used. Sun-dried banana leaves have also traditionally been used to package food for personal use on long journeys. 

A complete vegetarian Andhra meal typically consists of rice served with ghee, pulihora, chapati or puri, pappu (lentils), sambar, chaaru (rasam), fried and wet curries, appadam (papadum), odiyalu, chutney, pachadi, avakaya, yoghurt and a sweet for dessert. In general, food from the Vijayawada-Guntur region contains more chili and spices than food from the rest of Andhra Pradesh. Rice is considered the main dish and everything else is considered a side.

Vegetarian dishes

Meal presentation 
Pappu (dal/lentils) and kooralu (curries) are placed to the right of the diner, while spiced pickles, pachadi (chutney/raita), a saucy condiment with dahi (yogurt) , vegetables, pappulu podi (dal and dry red chili-based powdered condiment), and neyyi (ghee) are placed to the left. On some occasions, special items such as pulihora (tamarind or lemon rice) and garelu (vada) are placed at the top right. A large scoop of annam (plain white rice) is placed in the middle. Small amounts of neyyi are added on the rice. Avakaya (mango pickle) and gongura (roselle leaf pickle) are often served with the meal.

Courses and servings 

Rice is the main dish, eaten by mixing with the side dishes using the right hand, and the primary source of carbohydrates. Spiced pickles, pachadi, podi, and papadum (appadam) are typical side dishes.

A meal traditionally starts with modhati muddha (first bite), an appetizer of spiced pickle followed by a pappu(dal) dish, which can be made with vegetables added or eaten plain with a pickle. This constitutes the main source of protein for vegetarians. This is followed by a couple of koora varieties, which provide vitamins and minerals. A pappu or rasam (Telugu: charu), usually kadi, is the third course. The fourth course of the meal is either a perugu (curd or yoghurt) or majjiga (buttermilk) accompanied by a spicy pickle or other condiments.
 
After the meal, paan or somph (areca nut/betel on pan leaf) is traditionally offered. On festival days or other auspicious occasions, a sweet, usually paravannam, is served with the meal, which is usually eaten first.

Koora/kura/curry (main courses) 

Koora — a generic word for a protein-based dish. Koora dishes are named for the ingredients used and the method of preparation. These methods include:
Vepudu (fry): crispy fried vegetables, typically including okra (bendakaya), ivy gourd (dondakaya), potato (bangaladumpa), colocasia, and several additional local vegetables.
Pappu koora (lentil-based dish): boiled vegetables stir-fried with a small amount of half-cooked lentils (dal).
Podi (powdered dal-based condiment or seasoning): mixed with rice and a spoonful of ghee or sesame oil.
Gujju (gravy): a tomato or coriander seed base into which is added a chicken drumstick, brinjal (gutthi vankaya), okra, etc.
Pulusu (sour paste or gravy)
Pulusu koora/Aava petti koora (stew): boiled vegetables cooked in tamarind sauce and mustard paste. Some varieties include potlakaya, anapakaya, bendakaya, gummadikaya.
Kaaram petti koora/Koora podi koora (literally, "dish with curry powder added"): sautéed vegetables cooked with curry powder or paste, served as a solid mass. The vegetables can be stuffed with curry powder or paste and are usually cooked whole.
Pappucharu (thick dal broth) or charu
Charu  rasam (clear soup)
Ooragaya (pickle): avakaya, gongura, nimmakaya, etc.
Pachadi (pasty/saucy condiment or chutney): kobbari (coconut), tomato, gongura, dosakaya, gummadikaya, and allam (ginger).
 Other gravy-based curries are usually made with vegetables cooked in tomato sauce and onion with coriander and cumin powder.

Pappu (dal) 

Pappu (dal/lentils) dishes include toor daal (kandi pappu) and moong daal (pesara pappu), which are usually cooked with a vegetable or other green. No masala is added to the dal. In some areas, garlic and onion are included in the seasoning, while in others asafetida (hing/inguva) is used. Kandi pappu is often cooked with leafy vegetables such as palakura (spinach), gongura, malabar spinach, and other fruits and vegetables such as tomato, mango, or aanapakaya.  Sometimes the cooked version of the dal is replaced with a roasted and ground version, like kandi pachadi (roasted toor daal ground with red chilis), or pesara pachadi (soaked moong daal ground with red or green chilis).

A very popular combination in Andhra is mudda pappu (plain toor dal cooked with salt) and avakaya.

Pulusu 

Pulusu (meaning sour) is a curry-like stew that is typically sour and cooked with tamarind paste. Other common bases include tomatoes or mangoes. The mixture can be flavored with mustard, chilis, curry leaves, jaggery, onions, or fenugreek. Fish, chicken, and eggs are typical meat additions. Pachi pulusu is an unheated version of pulusu, typically made of mangoes or tamarind, and eaten during the warmer months.
 Majjiga pulusu: sour buttermilk boiled with channa dal and coconut paste
 Menthi challa/menthi majjiga: sour buttermilk seasoned with ginger or green chili paste and menthi (fenugreek) seeds, then fried in oil
 Mukkalu pulusu: pulusu made with aanapakaya
 Chammagadda pulusu: pulusu made with colocasia
 Kanda pulusu: pulusu made with yam
 Perugu (curd): the last dish of the meal, normally eaten along with pachadi or pickles

Pickles 
Pachadi and ooragaya are two broad categories of pickle that are eaten with rice. Pachadi is the Telugu version of chutney, typically made of vegetables/greens/lentils and roasted green or red chilis, using tamarind and sometimes curds as a base. It is prepared fresh and must be consumed within two days due to having a short shelf life. Ooragaya is prepared in massive amounts each season. Preparation includes using large amounts of chili powder, as well as menthi (fenugreek) powder, mustard powder, and groundnut (peanut) oil or sesame or mustard oil. It is either consumed on its own, mixed with rice, or as a side dish with pappu/koora.

Non-vegetarian dishes 

While a sizeable portion of the Telugu-speaking population are vegetarian, the majority also consume non-vegetarian dishes. The state of Andhra Pradesh produces abundant seafood and has an established poultry industry. Lamb meat has also been consumed for centuries in the region. Andhra restaurant chains and hotels are very popular in other states due to the extensive variety of meat featured on their menus.

Hyderabadi biryani and palaav, or "Andhra biryani", are popular dishes within the region. Royyala palav, made with shrimp, is considered a delicacy in coastal Andhra Pradesh. Mutton biryani and mixed biryani (chicken, mutton, and shrimp) are other popular biryani dishes, generally available in restaurants. There are many local variations as well, such as kaaja biryani, kunda biryani (pot biryani), avakaya biryani, ulavacharu biryani, and panasa biryani.

Kodi (chicken) koora and mutton koora are two popular meat dishes, often made with a range of spices and condiments. The base usually consists of onions, tomato, coriander, tamarind, and coconut. These are mixed with steamed rice on the plate during the meal. Pepper is also used on fried meat dishes. Popular dishes commonly served in Andhra-style restaurants include the spicy Andhra chili chicken, chicken roast, and mutton pepper fry. For seafood dishes, a tamarind base is generally used. Shrimp and prawns are widely available for use in cuisine, due to the state's extensive shrimp farming industry.

Other common meat dishes include:
Talakaya koora: a hearty meat curry with bold flavours, made with lamb's head, coriander, and spices.
Chepala pulusu: a fish curry seasoned with freshly ground spices and tamarind juice.
Endu chepala vankaya: a flavourful dry fish curry cooked with brinjal.
Royyala koora: prawns cooked in a tangy paste of tamarind and onion.
Gongura mamsam: spicy curry made with tender lamb pieces cooked in a curry of gongura (roselle leaves) and freshly-ground green chili paste.
Kodi gudllu pulusu: egg curry sprinkled with chopped onions, green chilis, and coriander.

These curries are usually served with steamed rice, bagara khana (basmati rice cooked with aromatic seasoning), sajja roti (millet flatbread), or jonna roti (jowar flatbread).

Non-vegetarian snacks include kodi pakodi (chicken pakora), chicken 65, peetha pakodi (crab pakodi), chepa vepudu (fish fry), royyala vepudu (shrimp fry), and chicken lollipop.

Bhimavaram town in West Godavari district is famous for its unique non-vegetarian pickles, such as chicken, shrimp, and fish pickles.

The area near Rajamundry and Araku is famous for bongu (bamboo) chicken curry.

Snacks

Some common Telugu snacks include:
Upma (ఉప్మా)
Boondi (బూంది)
Kaarappoosa (కారప్పూస)
Ponganalu (పొంగనాలు)
Bajji and  bondaalu or punukulu (బజ్జి, బోండాలు or పునుకులు), stuffed with spices, dipped in chickpea batter and fried; served with a spicy dip (allam pachadi). Other varieties include mirapakaya bajji (chili), vamu bajji, vankaya bajji (brinjal), aratikaya bajji (plantain), urla gadda bajji (potato), and vegetable bonda.

Pakodi (పకోడీ)
Ulli kaadalu pakodi
Sanna pakodi
Vankaya pakodi
Other varieties include royallu pakodi, kodi pakodi, and ullipakodi (fritters made with sliced onion and spices fried in chickpea batter)

Gaare (గారె), spiced deep-fried dough
Varieties include:perugu gaare/aavadalu (ఆవడలు), gaare marinated in a yogurt sauce, bellam garelu, rava garelu, ulli garelu, pulla garelu
Murukullu orjantikalu (జంతికలు)
Varieties include pesarapappu jantikalu, challa murukulu, chegodilu(చేగోడీలు), sakinalu or chakkidalu (చక్కిడాలు), chakli, chekkalu or chuppulu (చెక్కలు or చుప్పులు), maida chips, molocasia chips, plain papadam, and aam papad
Maramaraalu or puffed rice: Usually mixed with tomatoes, onions, coriander, lime juice, and chili powder.
Bean/pea snacks, such as senagala talimpu and guggillu (గుగ్గిళ్ళు)
Mixed snacks, such as boondi mixed with chopped onions and lemon juice

Sweets and savories 

Sweets and savories are typically made on festive and auspicious occasions, and are served to visiting relatives. Some of the savories below are also prepared as an evening snack.

 Pootharekulu, a sweet dish consisting of sweet powder with cardamom flavor stuffed into very thin pancake skins made of rice flour. Pootharekulu was created in Atreyapuram, a village in Andhra Pradesh.
 Kaaja, a deep-fried pastry filled with fruit or soaked in syrup. Variations such as madatha kaaja and kakinada kaaja are eaten across the region. 
 Sakinalu, one of the most popular savories, is often cooked during the Makara Sankranti festival season. It is a deep-fried snack made of rice flour and sesame seeds, flavored with ajwain (carom seeds or vaamu in Telugu).
 Kajjikayalu: fried dumpling stuffed with suji, dry coconut powder, and sugar. It is usually prepared during Deepavali.
 Sunnundallu, laddu made with roasted urad dal (minapappu) and jaggery (bellam)/ sugar. A generous amount of ghee is usually added to enhance the flavour.
 Ariselu, a sweet fried snack made of rice flour
 Boondi laddu
 Poornam boorelu  Poornalu, made by cooking chana dal until soft, cooling, then adding jaggery and cardamom powder. The mix is then rolled into balls, which are subsequently batter-fried. The batter that is used is made from urad dal. This sweet dish is usually served during a festival lunch.
 Rava laddu
 Bhakshalu or bobbatlu or polelu, sweet flatbread made of senega pappu (chickpea flour)
 Tapeswaram kaja
 Pulagam  pongali, a sweet dish made on a festival morning as an offering for a deity. Soaked rice is cooked in milk at a ratio of 1:2.5; when the rice is cooked, well-broken jaggery is added. The dish is completed by adding a splash of ghee and fried dry fruit.
 Payasam, a sweet pudding sometimes served in temples
 Gavvalu or "sweet shells" (Telugu: గవ్వలు, gavvalu), deep-fried and sugared balls of flour
 Chakodi, a crunchy ball of rice flour and chili, served hot.               
 Chakkera pongali (sugar pongal)
 Laskora undalu (coconut laddu) or raskora undalu (coconut laddu)
 Boondi, a fried snack made of chickpea flour
 Palathalikalu, an Indian sweet made during Ganesh Chaturthi
 Ravva kesari
 Pappuchekka
 Jeedilu
 Malai khaja, a traditional sweet from Nellore
 Kobbari lavuju, grated coconut flesh in molten jaggery or sugar syrup
 Vennappalu

Rural cuisine

In rural Andhra Pradesh, agriculture is the predominant occupation. Some centuries-old cooking practices can still be observed, particularly the use of mud pots, but this practice is being replaced by the use of steel utensils in recent decades. Traditional recipes have largely been influenced by what was grown and available locally earlier in history. In the drier districts, jowar (sorghum), bajra (millet) and ragi are still in use, while eating rice is seen as a symbol of prosperity. In the Delta and coastal districts, rice plays a major role in the cuisine.

See also
Telugu language
Telugu people
Telugu script
Telugu diaspora
Indian cuisine

References

External links

 
 
South Indian cuisine
Indian cuisine by culture
Indian cuisine by state or union territory